The Yedisu Dam is an earth-fill embankment dam on the Peri River (a tributary of the Euphrates), in Kiğı district of Bingöl Province, Turkey. Its primary purpose is hydroelectric power generation and is the second dam in the Peri River cascade. Construction on the dam began in 2009 and its power station was commissioned in 2011. The entire project was inaugurated in 2012. It is owned and operated by Özaltın Energy.

See also

Kığı Dam – upstream
Özlüce Dam – downstream

References

Dams in Bingöl Province
Earth-filled dams
Dams completed in 2012
Energy infrastructure completed in 2011
2012 establishments in Turkey
Dams on the Peri River
Hydroelectric power stations in Turkey
21st-century architecture in Turkey